Suzzara is a comune (municipality) in the Province of Mantua in the Italian region of Lombardy, located about  southeast of Milan and about  south of the city of Mantua.

Suzzara was given the honorary title of a city by a royal decree dated November 9, 1923. It is home to a large IVECO/CNH plant, producing Iveco Daily vehicles.

Geography
The municipality borders Dosolo, Gonzaga, Luzzara (RE), Motteggiana, Pegognaga and Viadana.

It includes six civil parishes (frazioni): Brusatasso, Riva, Sailetto, San Prospero, Tabellano, Vie Nuove.

Suzzara borders with Emilia-Romagna.

Twin towns
Suzzara is twinned with:
  Brioude, France, since 1995

See also
Andrea Romitti
Pinfari
Suzzara Calcio

References

External links

Official website 

Cities and towns in Lombardy